Dave Lapa is an independent diamond trader and founder of Overseas Diamonds. Lapa was born in Antwerp, Belgium on 18 November 1949, and has been working in the diamond industry for over 30 years.  His company, Overseas Diamonds, was founded in 1974 and based in Antwerp. It operated as a diamond marketing company. In 1978 it began manufacturing diamonds. By 2000, the company held offices in Israel, Hong Kong, South Africa, China and the USA. Overseas Diamonds folded in October 2009 after filing bankruptcy in Belgium.
 
In 2002 Lapa founded Overseas Diamonds Technologies. During 2002, Lapa invented and proceeded to develop the first Isee2 device, also known as the "Light Performance Technology" (LPT). The technology was later patented in 17 countries, and implemented through Overseas Diamonds Technologies with over 200 jewelry retailers worldwide.

In 2010 the Isee2 technology was sold to an Israeli company called Sarine Technologies Ltd under the name 'Sarine Light'.

References

Living people
1949 births
Businesspeople from Antwerp
Belgian business executives
Diamond dealers
Belgian inventors